Monstertrack is an alleycat race started by a New York City bike messenger,  "Snake", in the year 2000.  It is a race specifically for brakeless, fixed-gear bicycles.  It has gradually grown in size because of the surging popularity of track bikes. Carlos "Diablo" and Victor "Freeway" work as bike messengers, race organizers, and alleycat racers.  The two made the alleycat scene in New York more popular by extensively using the internet to spread the word about bike racing in New York and now Monstertrack is billed as the second largest alleycat in the nation, attracting racers from all over the US, Europe and Japan .

Cancellation of 2008 Monstertrack
Following the death of Matt Manger-Lynch, killed while participating in an alleycat in Chicago, the organizers of Monstertrack announced that the alleycat, scheduled as part of the Monstertrack event, had been cancelled.  In their statement the organisers said:

References

Cycle racing